This is a list of Israeli records in swimming, which are ratified by the Israel Swimming Association. To set a record, you have to be an Israeli citizen. All records were achieved in finals unless otherwise noted.

Long course (50 m)

Men

Women

Mixed relay

Short course (25 m)

Men

Women

Mixed relay

References
General
Israeli Long Course Records (Hebrew) 29 July 2022 updated
Israeli Short Course Records (Hebrew) 23 December 2022 updated
Specific

External links
Israel Swimming Association (Hebrew)

Israel
Records
Swimming records
Swimming